Peaches and cream is made by pouring a little cream over sliced peaches. It can also be made adding a spoonful of whipped cream on top of the sliced peaches. It is usually served as a dessert, but can also served for breakfast. It is popular in the USA (especially in the South) and in other countries. It is traditionally served in the summer when peaches are in season.

It is sometimes served at ice cream stands and float shops. Some types of hard candy, such as Creme Savers, also offer a peaches and cream flavor.

See also
 List of desserts

References

Desserts
Peaches
Cuisine of the Southern United States
Fruit dishes